European Security is a quarterly peer-reviewed academic journal published by Taylor and Francis for discussing challenges and approaches to security within the region as well as for Europe in a global context. It was established in 1992 with the founding editor Jacob Kipp (Fort Leavenworth), the current co-editors are Jocelyn Mawdsley (University of Newcastle) and Laura Chappell (University of Surrey).

Abstracting and indexing 
The journal is abstracted and indexed in:
 CSA Worldwide Political Science Abstracts
 International Bibliography of the Social Sciences
 International Political Science Abstracts
 The Lancaster Index to Defence and International Security Literature
 A Matter of Fact

References

External links 
 Official website

Taylor & Francis academic journals
International relations journals
Publications established in 1992
Quarterly journals